Max Lamb (born 1980) is a British furniture designer who combines traditional, often primitive, design methods with digital design. He is known for employing unusual approaches to using natural materials, including pouring pewter onto sand, and volcanic rock. 

His studio is based in North London.

Personal life 
Lamb was born in Cornwall in 1980. He attended Amersham & Wycombe College for art and design in 2000 where he received several awards. He also received a City and Guilds Photography Certificate in 2000. 

He later attended Northumbria University, receiving a degree in three dimensional design in 2003. In 2006, he received his master's degree in design products from the Royal College of Art. After graduation, his professor, industrial designer Tom Dixon, hired him as a special projects designer. 

Lamb started his own design firm in 2007. He has taught at Industrial Design at École cantonale d'art de Lausanne in Switzerland since 2008 and at the Royal College of Art. 

Lamb is married to jewelry designer Gemma Holt.

Works
Lamb works with a diverse range of materials including but not limited to stone, wood, metal, plastic, as well as "Marmoreal", a terrazzo-like composite material that he himself invented. He is known for his innovative approach and use of natural materials within his designs. An example of this experimentation is his triangular pewter stool, which he created by digging the form of the stool into the sand and pouring liquid pewter into the sand form. He has also made a pewter stool that combines hexagonal shapes. Another example of natural elements used in his art work is his nano-crystalline copper dishware collection.

Lamb often uses traditional techniques to achieve innovative contemporary solutions. His Urushi Series is a collection of seating, tables and cabinets finished with Urushi lacquer from Wajima, Ishikawa, Japan. The structure of each piece is obtained by cleaving chestnut with green-woodworking techniques in order to preserve the natural appearance of the wood. Urushi lacquer is then applied following traditional Japanese methods.

Lamb's respect for natural materials, specifically wood, is evident in the project 'My Grandfather's Tree by Max Lamb'. Shown for the first time at Somerset House (London, UK) in 2015, the project was a compilation of 131 logs installed and arranged in the same order the tree was meticulously cut. Originally the work formed a 187 years old Ash tree from Monckton Walk Farm (Yorkshire). As the tree started getting rotten, the designer decided to give it a new history; this resulted in a collection of 'general purpose' logs that respect the tree's life by revealing its growth rings, knots, branches and crotches.

The designer's extensive practice was epitomized in an exhibition entitled "Exercises in Seating" (2015) where he arranged in a circle 40 uniquely designed chairs that he made using various materials and techniques spanning the course of nearly ten years; the exhibition was held in Milan, Italy, during the Milan Design Week.

Exhibitions 
2023

Mirror Mirror: Reflections on Design at Chatsworth, United Kingdom

2019

 Max Lamb: Special Delivery - Salon 94 Design, New York, USA

2018

 Max Lamb: Exercises in Seating - The Art Institute of Chicago, USA
Re-Considering Canon - The Design Museum, London, UK
Poème Brut - Design Museum Gent, Belgium

2017
 Boulders by Max Lamb - New York, New York, Salo 94 Design
 Solid Textile Board benches by Max Lamb for Really and Kvadrat - Salone del Mobile, Milan, Italy

2016

 Villa Noailles Design Parade - Hyères, France
 Albanian Pavilion, Venice Biennale of Architecture - Venice, Italy
 Book & Branch - My Gandfather's Tree by Max Lamb - Gallery FUMI, London, UK
2015
 My Grandfather's Tree by Max Lamb – Presented by Gallery FUMI, Somerset House, London, UK
 Ayan Farah, Max Lamb, & Chris Succo - Almine Rech Gallery, London, UK
 Echo - Exhibition -The Gallery at Plymouth College of Art, Plymouth, UK
 Marmoreal, Design Miami/Basel - Dzek, Basel, Switzerland
 Exercises in Seating - Milan, Italy
2014
 Design is a State of Mind - Serpentine Gallery, London, UK
 Luke Gottelier & Max Lamb - Kate Macgarry, London, UK
 Marmoreal, Milan Design Week - Dzek, Milan, Italy
 2013
 Modern Makers, Chatsworth House, UK
2012
 Making Ideas: Experiments in Design, GlassLab, The Corning Museum of Glass, New York, US
 Mark-ing, British Council, Japan Design Week, Tokyo, Japan
 Rocky Crockery for 1882 Ltd, London Design Festival, London, UK
 RAW CRAFT, Fine Thinking In Contemporary Furniture, touring Exhibition by Crafts Council - Collect 2012, London, UK
2011
 Studioware - Gallery FUMI, London, UK
 Superba - J.F. Chen, Los Angeles, US
 Designs of the Year – Design Museum, London, UK
 Deptford Design Market Challenge, Studio Raw, London Design Festival, London, UK
 Prototypes & Experiments IV – The Aram Gallery, London, UK
2010
 The New Domestic Landscape - Northern Gallery for Contemporary Art, UK
 Commissioned - Milan Design Week, Milan, Italy
 Objects with a Void - Workshop For Potential Design, London, UK
 The Vermiculated Ashlar, HSBC Private Bank Design Collection Commission & London Design Festival - Victoria & Albert Museum, London, UK
2009
 Corn Craft, Gallery FUMI, London, UK
 Passionsweg Max Lamb, R. & L. Lobmeyer - Vienna Design Week, Austria
 Tokyo Designers Week - Tokyo, Japan
2008
 Beau Sauvage - Gallery Libby Sellers, London, England
 Max Lamb Solo Show - Johnson Trading Gallery, New York, US
 Materialism - Gallery FUMI, London, UK
 Solids of Revolution - Design Miami/Basel, Basel, Switzerland
2007
 Top Ten - British Council, Milan, Italy
 Max & Hannah Lamb - Godolphin House, Cornwall, UK
 Inspired by Cologne - Imm Colgne, Germany
 Decompressions Chamber – Northern Gallery of Contemporary Art, Sunderland, UK
2006
 Max Lamb & Robert Phillips - Canary Wharf, London, UK
 Design Mart - Design Museum, London
 Made by Machine - Milan Design Week, Italy
 Made in Nigeria - Yaba College of Technology, Lagos, Nigeria.
 The Greenhouse - Stockholm Furniture Fair, Sweden.
2005
 The Shop - The Royal College of Art, London, UK
 ISOS Collection - Furniture Works, London, UK
 The Castle Keep - Newcastle upon Tyne, UK
2004
 Work in Progress Show - The Royal College of Art, London, UK
 Design UK Selection - Gainsborough Studios, London, UK
 Made in Newcastle - Hamals Design Shop, Newcastle upon Tyne, UK
 Pulse - Earls Court, London, UK
 Design London - Superstudio 13, Milan Design Week, Milan, Italy
2003
 New Designers, Urban Interiors - Commonwealth Institute, London, UK
 Max Fraser’s Design Pick of 2003 - Gainsborough Studios, London, UK
2000
 Foundation Exhibition, Amersham & Wycombe College – Amersham, The Netherlands

Awards 

 2010 –  HSBC Design Collection Commission
 2009 –  'The Essence of the 21st Century' Courvoisier Award
 2008 –  ‘Designer of the Future’ - Design Miami/Basel
 2004 –  Hettich International Design Award

Museums acquisitions and collections 
 Centre National des Arts Plastiques, Paris, France - Urushi Stool
 The Israel Museum, Jerusalem, Israel - Sheet Steel Chair 
 Design Museum - London, UK
 Wolfsonian Museum - Miami, US
 Cooper Hewitt, New York, US - Copper Series Chair, Pewter Stool, Scrap Poly Chair
Design Museum Gent, Belgium - Jigsaw (Richlite)

Books / Publications 
My Grandfather's Tree (2015)

Exercises in Seating (2015)

China Granite Project II (2010)

References

Further reading
Triangular Pewter stool, 2008 process by Design Museum Holon on YouTube
Modern Day Artisans: Max Lamb by Hypebeast Ltd. on YouTube

External links 

 Official website

1980 births
People from Cornwall
British furniture designers
Living people
British interior designers
Alumni of the Royal College of Art
Alumni of Northumbria University